The Somali dwarf gecko (Lygodactylus somalicus) is a species of gecko found in northern Kenya, Somalia and Ethiopia.

References

Lygodactylus
Reptiles of Ethiopia
Reptiles of Kenya
Reptiles of Somalia
Taxa named by Arthur Loveridge
Reptiles described in 1935